The Lommatzsch Lom-61 Favorit is a single seat, high performance glider designed and built in the German Democratic Republic in the early 1960s. A small number were used by clubs.

Design and development
The Lommatzsch factory of the Volkseigener Betrieb Flugzeug (Association of the People's Aircraft Enterprises) was responsible for glider design and production in the DDR.  The Lom-61 was principally designed by Hans Wegerich, Hans Hartung and Wolfgang Heintze.

The Favorit has a high wing with a 6-series NACA laminar flow airfoil, straight tapered in plan.  This was built in two pieces around a single spar at 40% chord with pine and honeycomb supported plywood skin, linked by a central section integral with the fuselage. There are Schempp-Hirth airbrakes mounted further aft than usual, at 70% chord. The ailerons are gapless and split into pairs on either side.

The wooden fuselage of the Favorit is slender, with a maximum cross section of 0.38 m², and tapers rearwards only gently.  The tail surfaces are straight tapered, with marked sweep on the fin but none on the rudder, which extends to the keel.  The horizontal surfaces are mounted on top of the fuselage, forward enough for the rudder hinge to be ahead of the elevator trailing edge.  Forward of the wing, the cockpit is under a long, low, single piece canopy. The Favorit lands on a fixed monowheel, partially enclosed in the fuselage, rubber sprung and fitted with brakes, assisted by a rubber sprung nose skid.

The Lom-61 first flew, as its name suggests, around 1961.  Though variants for 1962-4 were discussed, they were not built.

Operational history
Only five Favorits were built, flying competitively in the DDR until 1980. One set a national record of 107 km/h (67 mph) over a 100 k (62 mi) triangle; another was the first to fly a German 50 km (310 mi) triangle.

Aircraft on display
German sailplane museum, Wasserkuppe:DM-2704

Specifications

References

Aircraft manufactured in East Germany
Glider aircraft
High-wing aircraft
Aircraft first flown in 1961